Altamirano is a Spanish surname. Notable people with the surname include:

Armin Altamirano Luistro
Carlos Altamirano (1922-2018), Chilean socialist politician 
Eric Altamirano(born 1966), Filipino basketball player and coach
Fernando Altamirano (1848-1908), Mexican physician and botanist on 
Héctor Altamirano, Mexican footballer
Ignacio Manuel Altamirano (1834-1893), Mexican novelist and politician
Luis Altamirano
Porfi Altamirano
Pedro de Anda Altamirano

Spanish-language surnames